Caveana diemseoki is a moth in the family Lecithoceridae. It is found in Thailand.

Description

References

Torodorinae
Moths of Asia
Endemic fauna of Thailand
Moths described in 2010